Aqrabat, Idlib  is a Syrian village located in Al-Dana Nahiyah in Harem District, Idlib.  According to the Syria Central Bureau of Statistics (CBS), Aqrabat, Idlib had a population of 388 in the 2004 census.

References 

Populated places in Harem District